Bentong (Jawi: ﺑﻨﺘﻮڠ), the seat of Bentong District, is a town located in western Pahang, Malaysia, at the border with the state of Selangor in the west and the state of Negeri Sembilan in the south.

Government 
Bentong Municipal Council is the local authority for the whole of Bentong District including Bentong town. From 5 May 1955 until 30 June 1981, Bentong town was governed by the Bentong Town Council. On 1 July 1981, the Bentong Town Council was merged with 5 local councils of Karak, Sungai Dua, Telemong, Manchis and Bukit Tinggi and 8 village councils of Kampung Shafie, Kampung Simpang Pelangai, Sungai Gapoi New Village, Kampung Jambu Rias, Kampung Benus, Genting Sempah, Kampung Janda Baik and Sungai Penjuring New Village to form the Bentong District Council.

Bentong District Council was upgraded to the present-day Municipal Council on 16 July 2005.

Weather 
Bentong average temperature is on  while  rainfall every month.

References

External links

Bentong District
Towns in Pahang